Tyrone Ranjit Etwaroo (born 23 August 1959) is a Guyanese former first-class cricketer who represented Berbice, Guyana and an International XI in first-class cricket.

Life and cricket career
Etwaroo was born at Port Mourant in August 1959, where he was educated at Corentyne Comprehensive High School. He debuted in first-class cricket for Berbice against Demerara in the 1977–78 Jones Cup at Georgetown. He was selected to play first-class cricket for Guyana in 1979–80 Shell Shield, making his debut against Barbados. In that same season he made his debut in List A one-day cricket for Guyana against the Windward Islands. Etwaroo played first-class and List A cricket for Guyana until 1984, making fifteen first-class and ten List A appearances. He toured Pakistan with an International XI in 1981–82, making on first-class and three List A appearances, He played a key role in the International XI in the first one-day match against Pakistan, scoring 22 runs opening the batting, which proved important in a low-scoring match. Etwaroo played a total of 23 first-class matches, scoring 1,131 runs at an average of 31.41. He made two centuries, with a high score 198 which he made in his final first-class match for Berbice against Demerara in the 1983–84 Jones Cup, an occasion on which he captained Berbice. In one-day cricket he made thirteen appearances, scoring 222 runs with a high score of 47.

He also played minor counties cricket in England for Northumberland from 1981–83, making seventeen appearances in the Minor Counties Championship and one appearance in the MCCA Knockout Trophy. He later emigrated to the United States, returning to Guyana annually with teams to take part in exhibition matches. He founded the Port Mourant Reunion Cricket Match, alongside his brothers Reginald and Romain, who both played first-class cricket. His uncle is the former West Indies cricketer Rohan Kanhai.

References

External links

1959 births
Living people
People from East Berbice-Corentyne
Guyanese cricketers
Berbice cricketers
Guyana cricketers
Northumberland cricketers